The MCS-48 microcontroller series, Intel's first microcontroller, was originally released in 1976. Its first members were 8048, 8035 and 8748. The 8048 is probably the most prominent member of the family. Initially, this family was produced using NMOS (n-type metal–oxide–semiconductor) technology. In the early 1980s, it became available in CMOS technology. It was manufactured into the 1990s to support older designs that still used it.

The MCS-48 series has a modified Harvard architecture, with internal or external program ROM and 64–256 bytes of internal (on-chip) RAM. The I/O is mapped into its own address space, separate from programs and data. 

Though the MCS-48 series was eventually replaced by the very successful MCS-51 series, it remained quite popular even by the year 2000 due to its low cost, wide availability, memory-efficient one-byte instruction set, and mature development tools. Because of this, it is used in high-volume, cost-sensitive consumer electronics devices such as TV remotes, computer keyboards, and toys.

Variants 
The 8049 has 2 KB of masked ROM (the 8748 and 8749 had EPROM) that can be replaced with a 4 KB external ROM, as well as 128 bytes of RAM and 27 I/O ports. The microcontroller's oscillator block divides the incoming clock into 15 internal phases, thus with its 11 MHz max. crystal one gets 0.73 MIPS (of one-clock instructions). Some 70% of instructions are single byte/cycle ones, but 30% need two cycles and/or two bytes, so the raw performance would be closer to 0.5 MIPS.

Uses 
The MCS-48 series was commonly used in computer and terminal keyboards, converting key presses into protocols that can be understood by digital circuits. This also allows the possibility of serial communication, reducing the amount of conductors needed in cables on external keyboards. Microprocessors had been used in keyboards since at least 1972, simplifying earlier discrete designs. The 8048 has been used in this application since its introduction in 1978.

The Tandy/Radio Shack TRS-80 Model II, released in 1979, used the 8021 in its keyboard.  The 8021 processor scans the key matrix, converts switch closures to an 8-bit code and then transmits that code serially to the keyboard interface on the main system.  The 8021 will also accept commands to turn indicator LEDs on or off. The 8021 was also used in the keyboards for the TRS-80 Model 12, 12B, 16, 16B and the Tandy 6000/6000HD.

The original IBM PC keyboard used an 8048 as its internal microcontroller. As well as managing the keyboard interface, the 8042 controlled the A20 line gating function for the AT's Intel 80286 CPU and could be commanded by software to reset the 80286 (unlike the 80386 and later processors, the 80286 had no way of switching from protected mode back to real mode except by being reset). Later PC compatibles integrate the 8042's functions into their super I/O devices.

The 8048 was used in the Magnavox Odyssey² video game console, the Korg Trident series, and the Korg Poly-61, Roland Jupiter-4 and Roland ProMars analog synthesizers. The Sinclair QL used the closely related Intel 8049 to manage its keyboard, joystick ports, RS-232 inputs and audio. The ROM-less 8035 variant was used in Nintendo's arcade game Donkey Kong to generate the background music.

Derived microcontrollers 
Philips Semiconductors (now NXP) owned a license to produce this series and developed their MAB8400-family based on this architecture. These were the first microcontrollers with an integrated I²C-interface and were used in the first Philips (Magnavox in the US) Compact Disc players (e.g. the CD-100).

See also 
 HSE-49 Emulator

References

Bibliography 
MCS-48
 MCS-48 Single Component Microcomputer, Applications Seminar Notebook, 1978, Intel Corporation.
 
 Lionel Smith, Cecil Moore: Serial I/O and Math Utilities for the 8049 Microcomputer, Application Note AP-49, January 1979, Intel Corporation.
 A High-Speed Emulator for Intel MCS-48 Microcomputers, Application Note AP-55A, August 1979, Intel Corporation.
 Phil Dahm, Stuart Rosenberg: Intel MCS-48 and UPI-41A Microcontrollers, Reliability Report RR-25, December 1979, Intel Corporation.
 Microcontroller Handbook, Intel 1984, Order number 210918-002.
 8-Bit Embedded Controllers, Intel 1991, Order number 270645-003.

UPI-41
 UPI-41A User's Manual, Intel 1980, Order number 9800504-02 Rev. B.
 
 Johan Beaston, Jim Kahn: An 8741A/8041A Digital Cassette Controller, Application Note AP-90, May 1980, Intel Corporation.

External links 
 MCS-48 family architecture
 
 Computer History Museum, Intel 8048 Microcontroller Oral History Panel
 Microcontroller NEC 8741 (image of the Silicon-Chip)

Computer-related introductions in 1976
Intel microcontrollers